Drift is the seventh studio album by American punk rock band The Men. It was released on March 2, 2018 under Sacred Bones Records.

Production
The album was recorded at Serious Business Records's studios with the help of musician and producer Travis Harrison.

Release
The album was first announced on January 10, 2018. The first single to be announced "Maybe I'm Crazy" was released on January 9, 2018. The second single from the album, "Rose on Top of the World" was released on January 31, 2018. The third single "Killed Someone" was released on February 22, 2018.

Critical reception
Drift was met with "generally favorable" reviews from critics. At Metacritic, which assigns a weighted average rating out of 100 to reviews from mainstream publications, this release received an average score of 63, based on 18 reviews. Aggregator Album of the Year gave the release a 64 out of 100 based on a critical consensus of 18 reviews.

Track listing

References

2018 albums
The Men (punk band) albums
Sacred Bones Records albums